Senator Johnson may refer to:

Members of the Bahamian Senate
Doris Sands Johnson (1921–1983), Bahamian Senator from 1967 to 1983

Members of the Canadian Senate
Janis Johnson (born 1946), Canadian Senator from Manitoba from 1990 to 2016

Members of the Confederate States Senate
Herschel Vespasian Johnson (1812–1880), Confederate States Senator from Georgia from 1863 to 1865
Waldo P. Johnson (1817–1885), Confederate States Senator from Missouri from 1863 to 1865

Members of the Liberian Senate
Elijah Johnson (agent) (c. 1789–1849), former president pro tempore of the Senate of Liberia
Prince Johnson (born 1952), Liberian Senator from Nimba County since 2006

Members of the United States Senate
Andrew Johnson (1808–1875), U.S. Senator from Tennessee from 1857 to 1862 and in 1875
Charles Fletcher Johnson (1859–1930), U.S. Senator from Maine from 1911 to 1917
Edwin C. Johnson (1884–1970), U.S. Senator from Colorado from 1937 to 1955
Edwin S. Johnson (1857–1933), U.S. Senator from South Dakota from 1915 to 1921
Henry Johnson (Louisiana politician) (1783–1864), U.S. Senator from Louisiana from 1818 to 1824
Herschel Vespasian Johnson (1812–1880), U.S. Senator from Georgia from 1848 to 1849
Hiram Johnson (1866–1945), U.S. Senator from California from 1917 to 1945
Lyndon B. Johnson (1908–1973), U.S. Senator from Texas from 1949 to 1961
Magnus Johnson (1871–1936), U.S. Senator from Minnesota from 1923 to 1925
Martin N. Johnson (1850–1909), U.S. Senator from North Dakota in 1909
Reverdy Johnson (1796–1876), U.S. Senator from Maryland from 1863 to 1868
Richard Mentor Johnson (1780–1850), U.S. Senator from Kentucky from 1819 to 1829
Robert Ward Johnson (1814–1879), U.S. Senator from Arkansas from 1853 to 1861
Ron Johnson (born 1955), U.S. Senator from Wisconsin since 2011
Tim Johnson (South Dakota politician) (born 1946), U.S. Senator from South Dakota from 1997 to 2015
Waldo P. Johnson (1817–1885), U.S. Senator from Missouri from 1861 to 1862
William Samuel Johnson (1727–1819),  U.S. Senator from Connecticut from 1789 to 1791

United States state senate members

Arkansas State Senate
Bob Johnson (Arkansas state senator) (born 1962)
David Johnson (Arkansas politician) (fl. 2000s–2010s)
James D. Johnson (1924–2010)

California State Senate
George A. Johnson (1829–1894)
Grove L. Johnson (1841–1926)
Harold T. Johnson (1907–1988)
James A. Johnson (California politician) (1829–1896)
Ray E. Johnson (1911–1993)
Ross Johnson (politician) (1939–2017)

Colorado State Senate
Donna R. Johnson (born c. 1934)
Steve Johnson (Colorado politician) (born 1960)

Florida State Senate
Beth Johnson (American politician) (1909–1973)
Dewey M. Johnson (1917–1989)
Elisha G. Johnson (died 1875)
J. B. Johnson (Florida politician) (1868–1940)

Georgia State Senate
B. Ed Johnson (1914–1983)
Don Johnson Jr. (born 1948)
Eric Johnson (Georgia politician) (born 1953)
Leroy Johnson (Georgia politician) (1928–2019)

Illinois State Senate
Christine J. Johnson (born 1953)
Tom Johnson (Illinois politician) (1945–2018)

Kentucky State Senate
Ben Johnson (politician) (1858–1950)
James Johnson (Kentucky politician) (1774–1826)
Thomas Johnson (Kentucky politician) (1812–1906)

Maryland State Senate
Reverdy Johnson (1796–1876)
Thomas Francis Johnson (1909–1988)

Michigan State Senate
Bert Johnson (Michigan politician) (born 1973)
Daniel Johnson (Michigan politician) (1821–1860)
Ransom C. Johnson (1849–1904)
Ruth Johnson (born 1955)
Shirley Johnson (1937–2021)

Minnesota State Senate
Alice Johnson (politician) (born 1941)
Dave Johnson (Minnesota politician) (born 1963)
Dean Johnson (politician) (born 1947)
Debbie Johnson (born 1957)
Janet Johnson (politician) (1940–1999)
John A. Johnson (Minnesota politician) (1883–1962)
John Albert Johnson (1861–1909)
Mark Johnson (Minnesota politician)
Robert George Johnson (1925–1969)

Nebraska State Senate
Fred Gustus Johnson (1876–1951)
Jerry Johnson (politician) (born 1942)
Joel T. Johnson (born 1936)
Roy W. Johnson (politician) (1882–1947)

New Jersey State Senate
James A. C. Johnson (1867–1937)
William M. Johnson (1847–1928)

New York State Senate
Craig M. Johnson (born 1971)
Daniel Johnson (Rockland County, NY) (1790–1875)
George Y. Johnson (1820–1872)
Noadiah Johnson (1795–1839)
Owen H. Johnson (1929–2014)
Robert E. Johnson (New York politician) (1909–1995)
Stephen C. Johnson (state senator) (fl. 1840s)
William Elting Johnson (1837–1912)
William Johnson (Seneca County, NY) (1821–1875)

North Carolina State Senate
Charles Johnson (North Carolina politician) (died 1802)
Todd Johnson (politician) (born 1970s)

Ohio State Senate
Anice Johnson (1919–1992), Ohio State Senate
Bruce Johnson (Ohio politician) (born 1960)
Calvin C. Johnson (born 1929)
Jeff Johnson (Ohio politician) (born 1958)
John Johnson (Ohio congressman) (1805–1867)

Oklahoma State Senate
Constance N. Johnson (born 1952)
Jed Johnson (Oklahoma politician) (1888–1963)
Mike Johnson (Oklahoma politician) (born 1944)

South Dakota State Senate
John B. Johnson (politician) (1885–1985)
Robert A. Johnson (South Dakota politician) (1921–2014)

Texas State Senate
Eddie Bernice Johnson (born 1935)
Nathan M. Johnson (born 1968)

West Virginia State Senate
Daniel D. Johnson (1836–1893)
Okey Johnson (1834–1903)

Wisconsin State Senate
Bruce Johnson (Wisconsin politician) (1875–1932)
John Anders Johnson (1832–1901)
La Tonya Johnson (born 1972)
Olaf H. Johnson (1892–1966)
Otis Wells Johnson (1855–1926)
Raymond C. Johnson (1936–1979)

Other states
A. R. Johnson (1856–1933), Louisiana State Senate
Betsy Johnson (born 1951), Oregon State Senate
Chapman Johnson (1779–1849), Virginia State Senate
Chris Johnson (Maine politician) (fl. 2010s), Maine State Senate
Dan G. Johnson (fl. 2010s), Idaho State Senate
David Johnson (Iowa politician) (born 1950), Iowa State Senate
Doris Johnson (born 1923), Washington State Senate
Jack Johnson (American politician) (born 1968), Tennessee State Senate
James Hutchins Johnson (1802–1887), New Hampshire State Senate
John J. Johnson (1926–2016), Missouri State Senate
Joseph B. Johnson (1893–1986), Vermont State Senate
Karen Johnson (politician), Arizona State Senate
Kevin L. Johnson (born 1960), South Carolina State Senate
Nancy Johnson (born 1935), Connecticut State Senate
Timothy L. Johnson (born 1959), Mississippi State Senate
Wayne Johnson (Wyoming politician) (born 1942), Wyoming State Senate

See also
Senator Johnston (disambiguation)